The Southwest Central League (SWCL) is a high school athletic conference in southwest Missouri. The league is made of eight full members and one affiliate member located in Barry, Christian, Stone, and Taney Counties. The SWCL offers Men's Championships in baseball, basketball, cross country, and golf. Women's championships sponsored are basketball, cross country, softball and volleyball. Member schools also sponsor sideline cheerleading, music competition, and Scholar Bowl. Junior high level offerings include boys' and girls' basketball, baseball, and volleyball.  All member schools are members of Missouri State High School Activities Association.

Member Schools

^ Sparta will be leaving the SWCL at the conclusion of the 2022-2023 school year

^^Unknown, but records show Galena was a member by 1963.

Membership Changes 
In December 2017 it was announced that Purdy High School would be leaving the Ozark 7 Conference to accept a "long-standing" invitation to join the Southwest Central League. It was also reported that Southwest R-V Schools would also be leaving the Ozark 7 to join the SWCL. This move was made official in January 2018. Both Purdy and Southwest became full members beginning in the 2018-2019 academic year. The move expanded the Southwest Central League's footprint to include Barry County.

In January 2022, the school board of the Sparta School District voted to accept an invitation to the Summit Conference beginning in the 2023-2024 school year ending a 36 year membership in the SWCL.

Former Members

State champions

References

Missouri high school athletic conferences